Heltermaa is a village in Hiiumaa Parish, Hiiu County, in northwestern Estonia. The village is the site of the seaport connecting Hiiumaa with Rohuküla harbour on the mainland by ferry.

The village is first mentioned in 1620 (Heltermecky). Historically, the village was part of Suuremõisa Manor.

Before 1977, the village was part of Aruküla village.

References

Villages in Hiiu County